Desecration is the act of depriving something of its sacred character.

Desecration may also refer to:

 Desecration (band), a Welsh death metal band
 Desecration (novel), the ninth book in the Left Behind series
 Desecration (film), a 1999 American horror film